Perkins is an unincorporated community in Delta County, Michigan, United States. Perkins has a post office with ZIP code 49872.

History 
Perkins was founded around 1872 by the Cascade Company, which made charcoal kilns and cut lumber in the community. It was originally located on the Whitefish Branch of the Chicago and North Western Railway. A post office opened in Perkins on May 7, 1894; John Fuhriman was the first postmaster. The community was named for Josiah Perkins, an early settler.

References

Unincorporated communities in Delta County, Michigan
Populated places established in 1872
1872 establishments in Michigan
Unincorporated communities in Michigan